St. Stephen's Episcopal Cathedral is a cathedral of the Episcopal Church in the United States.  It is the mother church of the Episcopal Diocese of Central Pennsylvania and is the seat of its bishop. The Cathedral, Cathedral House and Chapter House are located on Front Street in Downtown Harrisburg, Pennsylvania along the Susquehanna River. St. Stephen's School is just around the corner on Cranberry Street. The nave of the church was constructed in 1826 and can seat about 300 people.  St. Stephen's became the diocesan cathedral on January 27, 1932.  The church is a contributing property in the Harrisburg Historic District on the National Register of Historic Places.

See also
List of the Episcopal cathedrals of the United States
List of cathedrals in the United States

References

External links
 St. Stephen's Episcopal Cathedral official web site
 Episcopal Diocese of Central Pennsylvania official web site

Stephen, Harrisburg
Episcopal Diocese of Central Pennsylvania
Episcopal churches in Pennsylvania
Churches completed in 1826
19th-century Episcopal church buildings
Churches in Dauphin County, Pennsylvania
Churches in Harrisburg, Pennsylvania
Tourist attractions in Harrisburg, Pennsylvania
Churches on the National Register of Historic Places in Pennsylvania
Historic district contributing properties in Pennsylvania
1826 establishments in Pennsylvania
National Register of Historic Places in Harrisburg, Pennsylvania